Caerphilly County Borough straddles the boundary of the historic counties of Glamorgan and Monmouthshire in South Wales. The 46 scheduled monuments include burial cairns from the Bronze Age, an Iron Age hillfort, and Roman camps. The medieval sites include two castles and a further four mottes as well as dwellings, crosses and churches. Finally the post-medieval sites include the blast furnaces and ironworks of the industrial period.

Scheduled monuments have statutory protection. The compilation of the list is undertaken by Cadw Welsh Historic Monuments, which is an executive agency of the National Assembly of Wales. The list of scheduled monuments below is supplied by Cadw with additional material from RCAHMW and Glamorgan-Gwent Archaeological Trust.

Scheduled monuments in Caerphilly

See also
List of Cadw properties
List of castles in Wales
List of hill forts in Wales
Historic houses in Wales
List of monastic houses in Wales
List of museums in Wales
List of Roman villas in Wales
Grade I listed buildings in Caerphilly
Grade II* listed buildings in Caerphilly

References
Coflein is the online database of RCAHMW: Royal Commission on the Ancient and Historical Monuments of Wales, GGAT is the Glamorgan-Gwent Archaeological Trust, Cadw is the Welsh Historic Monuments Agency

Caerphilly
Buildings and structures in Caerphilly County Borough